Impatiens paucidentata is an epiphytic species of Impatiens native to Uganda and the eastern Democratic Republic of the Congo.

References 

paucidentata
Taxa named by Émile Auguste Joseph De Wildeman